Susan V. John (November 20, 1957 – November 22, 2021) was an American politician who served in the New York State Assembly from Monroe County, New York. A Democrat, she represented the 131st district from January 1, 1991, to December 31, 2010. She was succeeded by Harry Bronson, a fellow Democrat.

She died of cancer on November 22, 2021, in Englewood, Florida, two days after her 64th birthday.

References

1957 births
2021 deaths
Politicians from Chicago
Democratic Party members of the New York State Assembly
Women state legislators in New York (state)
Deaths from cancer in Florida
21st-century American women